Mexico City is the capital and most populous city of Mexico.

Mexico City may also refer to:

Mexico City (film), a 2000 Canadian film
Greater Mexico City, a metropolitan area that contains Mexico City and adjacent municipalities
Mexico City (former administrative division), a former subdivision of the then-Federal District
Mexico City International Airport
1968 Summer Olympics

See also
Boroughs of Mexico City
List of cities in Mexico
Battle of Mexico City (disambiguation)
Mexico (disambiguation)